Shut Yo' Mouth is a 1981 collaboration album by bassists Major Holley and Slam Stewart, released on PM Records and Delos Records.

Track listing
"Tomorrow"
"I Love You"
"Would You Like To Take A Walk"
"Side By Side"
"Close Your Eyes"
"Undecided"
"Wrap Your Troubles In Dreams"
"Misty"
"My Blue Heaven"

Personnel
Bass, Vocals – Major Holley, Slam Stewart
Drums – Oliver Jackson
Piano, Organ – Dick Hyman

References

1981 albums
Jazz albums by American artists
Chamber jazz albums
Swing albums
Vocal jazz albums
Jazz-pop albums
Post-bop albums